Gary Alex Bartlett (born 3 February 1941) is a former New Zealand cricketer. He played 10 Test matches for New Zealand in the 1960s as a fast bowler.

Domestic career
Bartlett made his first-class debut for Central Districts in the 1958–59 season aged only 17, and played all four matches for New Zealand in the non-Test series against an Australian XI in the following season. Wisden described him as "the real discovery of the season". The Australian captain, Ian Craig, described facing him in the first match of the series in Wellington: "I saw Bartlett let go of the ball, but the first I knew of where it had gone was the sound of it hitting the gloves yards behind me. I think it was the quickest bowling I faced."

Bartlett moved to Canterbury for the 1963–64 season where he was a member of the Burnside West Christchurch University Cricket Club. He was one of the leading players in the Plunket Shield in 1965–66, scoring 228 runs at an average of 32.57 and taking 20 wickets at 19.65. He returned to Central Districts in 1966–67, and played his last first-class matches in the 1969–70 season.

Bartlett also had a successful career for Marlborough in the Hawke Cup between 1958 and 1970. In his first match, against Waikato in 1957–58, aged 16, he took 6 for 37 and 2 for 11 and hit the match top score of 52 not out. In 1967–68 he captained Marlborough when they won the title for the first time, scoring 80 in the first innings (the highest score on either side in the match) and taking four wickets in each innings in the victory over Hutt Valley.

International career
He toured South Africa in 1961–62, making his Test debut and playing all five Tests. He took only eight wickets but made useful runs (215 at 23.88) batting at eight or nine. He made only occasional Test appearances thereafter, all in New Zealand. Dissatisfied with his fitness, he made himself unavailable for New Zealand's tour of India, Pakistan and England in 1965, although the selectors wanted him to tour. His outstanding Test moment came in the Second Test against India in Christchurch in 1967–68, when he took 6 for 38 – at the time the best figures in Tests by a New Zealand bowler – in the second innings to help New Zealand to its first victory over India.

The New Zealand cricket historian Don Neely described Bartlett as "New Zealand's first bowler of devastating pace". Unfortunately his successes, and much of his career, were overshadowed by doubts about the legitimacy of his bowling action. During the Christchurch Test in 1968 the Indian bowler Syed Abid Ali protested against Bartlett's action by blatantly throwing the ball himself. Bartlett missed the next Test, but when he was selected for the Fourth Test, the Indian manager, Ghulam Ahmed, protested. According to the Indian captain, the Nawab of Pataudi, "All the Indian players, including myself, considered Bartlett's action to be suspect." Despite the doubts and accusations, Bartlett was never no-balled for throwing.

References

Further reading
 Meteor over Marlborough: The Gary Bartlett Story by John Alexander (2014)

External links
 Gary Bartlett at Cricinfo

1941 births
Living people
New Zealand cricketers
New Zealand Test cricketers
Canterbury cricketers
Central Districts cricketers
Cricketers from Blenheim, New Zealand
People educated at Marlborough Boys' College